Beach Blanket Volleyball is a 1986 video game published by Artworx.

Gameplay
Beach Blanket Volleyball is a game in which a team of three volleyball players compete against a human or computer opponent.

Reception
Rick Teverbaugh reviewed the game for Computer Gaming World, and stated that "Graphics [...] aren't spectacular, at least on the Commodore versions I tested. But they do a good enough job to make playing the game smooth and simple."

References

External links
Review in Commodore Magazine

1986 video games
Artworx games
Volleyball video games